Air Vice-Marshal Francis Scholes ‘Frank’ McGill, CB (June 20, 1894 – June 28, 1980) was a prominent member of Canada's military, having been an air vice marshal in the RCAF, and a considerable sports figure, amongst other things a star football player in the Canadian Football League for the Montreal AAA Winged Wheelers.

Sports career
McGill was born on June 20, 1894 in Montreal, Quebec to John Jones McGill and Eliza Jane Bryson. He played college football at McGill University, where he also starred at hockey, water polo and swimming. He was inducted into the Canadian Football Hall of Fame in 1965 and into the Canada's Sports Hall of Fame in 1959.

Military career
Frank McGill served in First World War as a pilot for the Royal Naval Air Service, after graduating from McGill in 1913. At the outbreak of War in 1914, a brief period in the Army training corps found McGill extremely bored, following which he promptly joined the Royal Naval Air Service. During the First World War he served in combat and as a test pilot, and was decorated for his Royal Flying Corps work. In 1915 while flying with an instructor over the Thames estuary, McGill's plane crashed, resulting in a fractured arm and stay in the Royal Naval Hospital. In 1917 he was appointed second-in-command to a small flying boat force in the Scilly Isles, England.

In February 1919 Capt. McGill was the 1st Pilot in a flying boat that crashed in poor weather off Newlyn in Cornwall.  Capt. McGill saved the life of 2nd Lt. HD Morley. The two remained in correspondence until the death of HD Morley in 1978.

During the inter-war period, Air Vice Marshal McGill organized and led an RCAF squadron which eventually became the country's primary fighter unit and participated in the Battle of Britain. He played a founding role in the development of the Commonwealth Air Training Plan, as well as serving as the first commanding officer of Uplands and Trenton airforce bases.

In September 1939 Wing Commander McGill was called up to active service. He was the commanding officer of no. 1 Service Flying Training School at Camp Borden, and during 1940–1941, he was organizer and first commanding officer of no. 2 Service Flying Training School at Uplands. Further postings followed as Director of Postings and Records in 1941 to Air Force Headquarters, and as commanding officer to No. 2 (Movements) Group Headquarters at Halifax in 1941-1942 and to RCAF Station Trenton in 1942-1942.

In 1943, he was promoted Air Commodore and given command of No. 2 Training command in Toronto. Following another promotion to Air Vice Marshal, he returned to Air Force Headquarters in December 1943, where he remained for the rest of the war as Air Member for Organization, later Air Member for Supply and Organization. McGill retired from the RCAF in 1946. From 1951 to 1961 he was Director of the Aircraft Production branch of the Department of Defence Production. He died in Montreal on June 28, 1980.

References

 Canada's Sports Hall of Fame profile

1894 births
1980 deaths
Canadian football people from Montreal
Players of Canadian football from Quebec
Ice hockey people from Quebec
McGill Redbirds football players
McGill Redmen ice hockey players
Canadian Football Hall of Fame inductees
Burials at Mount Royal Cemetery